Big Ten Universities is a Division 1-A college rugby conference founded in summer 2012 by ten of the twelve schools that then made up the Big Ten Conference (which has since expanded to 14 members). The Big Ten Universities was formed to improve rugby among the Big Ten schools by capitalizing on traditional Big Ten rivalries, increasing the number of fans, attracting talented high school rugby players, and playing other regional schools, which would create more competitive matchups with traditional rivals.

Prior to 2012, most of these schools had played in the now defunct Division 1-AA Midwest conference (Iowa, Minnesota, Nebraska, Wisconsin) and the Division 1-AA Mid-Eastern conference (Indiana, Michigan State, Purdue). Ohio State had played in Division 1-A in the East conference.

Organization of college rugby has been evolving since 2009, with many schools organizing into conferences similar to the traditional NCAA conferences. In November 2010, USA Rugby's college management committee set out a plan for transitioning universities to NCAA-style conferences. The purpose of the realignment is for college rugby to capitalize on the marketability of major college conference rivalries.

Members

Notes:
 Four Big Ten members do not play rugby in Big Ten Universities:
 Conference charter members University of Iowa, University of Minnesota, and University of Nebraska compete in the D1AA Heart of America Conference. 
Conference charter member Northwestern compete in NCR D2.
 Penn State, a Big Ten member since 1990, plays in the Rugby East conference of Division 1-A.
 The two schools that joined the Big Ten in 2014, Maryland and Rutgers, respectively play in the NCR Chesapeake Rugby Conference and the Liberty Rugby Conference.

Results

Regular season

Fall 2012

Notes:
 Bold means qualified for playoffs
 (E) and (W) identify division champions
 Indiana's Fall 2014 Team penalized for eligibility misconduct

Fall 2013

Fall 2014 (excluding BTU Playoff game)

Big Ten 7s 
The Big Ten schools have formed the Big Ten 7s tournament.  The Big Ten tournament features a round of pool play, followed by knockout play. The winner of the Big Ten 7s earns an automatic berth to the USA Rugby Sevens Collegiate National Championships and to the Collegiate Rugby Championship.

The inaugural Big Ten tournament was held August 2011, and hosted by Wisconsin. Wisconsin and Penn State dominated, each winning its respective pool and advancing in knockout play to the finals, where Wisconsin defeated Penn State 21-14. Wisconsin's victory at the 2011 Big Ten 7s earned it the right to compete for the national championship at the 2011 USA Rugby Sevens Collegiate National Championships.

See also
 College rugby
 College Premier Division
 Big Ten Conference

References

External links
 

 
College rugby union competitions in the United States